En remontant le Mississippi is a Lucky Luke comic written by Goscinny and Morris. It is the sixteenth title in the Lucky Luke Series. The comic was printed by Dupuis in 1961 and by Cinebook in English in 2021 as Steaming Up the Mississippi. 
Both Goscinny and Morris were avid readers of frontier tales and particularly Mark Twain books.
This album is culturally significant as it is connected with Mark Twain's experience as a Mississippi steamboat pilot before the American Civil War.

The plot and many details like safety-last style of sailing, card sharks aboard, tampering with safety valves, unloading passengers to speed up the ship, etc. are borrowed from the famous (or infamous) 1870 race between paddle steamers Robert E. Lee under the command of Captain John Cannon and Natchez IV, under Captain Thomas Leathers.

Plot 
Competition is fierce among steamboats captains plying the Mississippi river. Sleazy and devious Captain Lowriver, master of paddle steamer Abestos D. Plover is trying to establish a monopoly on the New Orleans-Minneapolis line and wants his arch rival Captain Barrows, master of the Daisy Belle out of the way. Both captains finally devise a race from New Orleans to Minneapolis to settle the matter: whoever wins the race remains sole operator of steamboats on the Mississippi. Confident in his ship and crew capabilities but fearing foul play from his opponent part Captain Barrows hires Lucky Luke as a supervisor and bodyguard.

And foul play there is: Lowriver hires a professional gambler who almost manages to win Barrows' ship in a rigged-up poker game, an attempt foiled at the last minute by the wiser Lucky Luke.

The voyage goes on, with the floods, droughts and snag tree-trunks constantly impairing both ship's progress up Mississippi. Lucky Luke is a helpful hand on board as a pilot, constantly gauging the river depth and avoiding the Daisy Belle being stranded after the ship has lost the main river bed during a flood. His task aboard is loosely modelled on Mark Twain's job on Mississippi steamboats, which inspired his famous pen-name.

Lowriver keeps trying to cheat his opponent out of the race: he hires a gunman (who however skilled is no match for Lucky Luke) and later a big bald-headed bully brute called Ironhead Wilson whose bullet-proof cranium is a deadly weapon. Ironhead Wilson methodically batters the ship's boiler to pieces with his head and allows Lowriver's ship (aboard which passengers have been disembarked at gunpoint to lighten the craft) take the lead during the final stage to Minneapolis.

Unable to get rid of him with bullets, Lucky Luke punches his opponent's ribcage with his fists, which Ironhead Wilson feels like a mere tickling and bursts in an uncontrollable laughter that makes him jump overboard, only to be attacked by alligators.

While Wilson mashes the alligators to a pitiful condition and escapes unscathed, Barrows and his crew patch up the boiler and start gaining fast on the rival ship as the finish line in Minneapolis is in sight. Aboard both ships, engineers and stokers try to raise more steam pressure and pelt more wood into the boilers, only to have the safety valves opening.

Infuriated and half crazy Lowriver then sits atop the valve counterweight, allowing his ship to regain the lead, while Barrows, concerned with his passengers' and crews' safety, admits defeat. In a final twist, the boiler of Lowriver's ship explodes in a spectacular fashion, destroying everything and sending Lowriver and his crew in the water where hungry and smiling alligators are awaiting them.

A rather dejected and alligator-bitten Lowriver is fished out by Lucky Luke and admits his defeat, but a magnanimous Barrows tells him that "There is plenty of space for everybody on this old river" and proceeds to the Minneapolis greeting ceremony, while Lucky Luke slips out and makes his trademark exit into the sunset, singing his favorite song.

References

 Morris publications in Spirou BDoubliées

External links
 Lucky Luke official site album index 
Goscinny website on Lucky Luke

Comics by Morris (cartoonist)
Lucky Luke albums
1961 graphic novels
Works by René Goscinny